Abraham Woyna (Wojna) (1569–1649) was a Roman Catholic priest and auxiliary bishop of Vilnius (1611–1626), bishop of Samogitia (1626–1631) and then bishop of Vilnius (1631–1649). His term in office was marked by the rise of Calvinism in the Polish–Lithuanian Commonwealth, to which he was actively opposed.

Among his achievements was the foundation of the monasteries of the Discalced Carmelites and the Good Friars in Vilna (modern Vilnius, Lithuania), the latter of which also opened up a hospital and a pharmacy nearby. He also led the anti-Protestant faction in the local politics and led the persecution of the Calvinist activists .

Bibliography
 Wileński słownik biograficzny. Bydgoszcz: 2002. .

External links 
 Bishop Abraomas Voina (Wojna)

1569 births
1649 deaths
Abraham
17th-century Roman Catholic bishops in the Polish–Lithuanian Commonwealth
Bishops of Vilnius
16th-century Polish nobility
17th-century Polish nobility